Minuscule 627 (in the Gregory-Aland numbering), α 53 (von Soden), is a Greek minuscule manuscript of the New Testament, on parchment. Palaeographically it has been assigned to the 10th century. The manuscript is lacunose. Tischendorf labelled it by 160a, 193p, and 24r.
It has unusual order of books: the Book of Revelation is placed between Book of Acts and the Catholic epistles.

Description 

The codex contains the text of the New Testament except the four Gospels, on 187 parchment leaves (size ), with lacunae at the beginning and end (Acts 1:1-28:19; Hebrews 3:12-13:25). The text is written in one column per page, 26 lines per page.

The order of books is unusual: Acts of the Apostles, Book of Revelation, Catholic epistles, Pauline epistles. The Epistle to the Hebrews is placed after the Epistle to Philemon. Minuscule 175 has the same sequence of the New Testament books, but it has the Gospels at the beginning of the codex.

Text 

The Greek text of the codex is a representative of the Byzantine text-type. Kurt Aland placed it in Category V.

History 

Scrivener dated the manuscript to the 11th century; Gregory, Aland and the INTF to the 10th century.

Formerly it was known as Basilian 101. The manuscript was examined and described by Giuseppe Bianchini. It was added to the list of New Testament manuscripts by Johann Martin Augustin Scholz, who slightly examined the whole manuscript. Gregory saw the manuscript in 1886.

Formerly it was labelled by 160a, 193p, and 24r. In 1908 Gregory gave the number 627 to it. Herman C. Hoskier collated the text of the Apocalypse.

The manuscript is currently housed at the Vatican Library (Vat. gr. 2062), at Rome.

See also 

 List of New Testament minuscules
 Biblical manuscript
 Textual criticism

References

Further reading 
 Giuseppe Bianchini, Evangeliarium quadruplex latinae versionis antiquae seu veteris italicae (Rome, 1749)
 Herman C. Hoskier, Concerning the Text of the Apocalypse: Collation of All Existing Available Greek Documents with the Standard Text of Stephen’s Third Edition Together with the Testimony of Versions, Commentaries and Fathers. 1 vol. (London: Bernard Quaritch, Ltd., 1929), pp. 51–52. (for r)

Greek New Testament minuscules
10th-century biblical manuscripts
Manuscripts of the Vatican Library